Hilda Santiago (born May 19, 1955) is an American politician who has served in the Connecticut House of Representatives from the 84th district since 2013.  Graduated at O.H. Platt High School in Meriden, Connecticut. She obtained a Bachelor of Science in Secondary Education from Southern Connecticut State University, majoring in History and Latin American Studies.

References

1955 births
American people of Puerto Rican descent
American politicians of Puerto Rican descent
Living people
Connecticut Democrats
Democratic Party members of the Connecticut House of Representatives
Hispanic and Latino American women in politics
Southern Connecticut State University alumni
Puerto Rican people in Connecticut politics
Women state legislators in Connecticut
21st-century American politicians
21st-century American women politicians
People from Naranjito, Puerto Rico